Tungurahua (from Quichua tunguri (throat) and rahua (fire), "Throat of Fire") is an active stratovolcano located in the Cordillera Oriental of Ecuador. The volcano gives its name to the province of Tungurahua. Volcanic activity restarted on August 19, 1999, and is ongoing , with several major eruptions since then, the last starting on 1 February 2014.

Etymology 
According to one theory the name Tungurahua is a combination of the Quichua tunguri (throat) and rahua (fire) meaning "Throat of Fire". According to another theory it is based on the Quichua uraua for crater. Tungurahua is also known as "The Black Giant", and in local indigenous mythology it is allegedly referred to as Mama Tungurahua ("Mother Tungurahua").

Geography and geology

Location 
Nearby notable mountains are Chimborazo and El Altar. It rises above the small thermal springs town of Baños de Agua Santa which is located at its foot  to the north. Other nearby towns are Ambato ( to the northwest), Baños and Riobamba ( to the southwest). Tungurahua is part of the Sangay National Park.

Glacier 
Tungurahua's top is snow-covered and did feature a small summit glacier which melted away after the increase of volcanic activity in 1999.

Volcanism 
Today's volcanic edifice (Tungurahua III) is constructed inside its predecessor's (Tungurahua II) caldera which collapsed about 3000 (±90) years ago. The original edifice (Tungurahua I) collapsed at the end of the Late Pleistocene.

Historical volcanic activity 
Tungurahua's eruptions are strombolian. They produce andesite and dacite. All historical eruptions originated from the summit crater and have been accompanied by strong explosions, pyroclastic flows and sometimes lava flows. In the last 1,300 years Tungurahua entered every 80 to 100 years into an activity phase of which the major have been the ones of 1773, 1886 and 1916–1918.

Study of volcanic ash layers deposited in the lakes of El Cajas National Park show that there were major eruptions 3,034±621, 2,027±41, 1,557±177, 733±112 years ago (cal BP).

Recent volcanic activity 
In 2000, after a long period of quiescence, the volcano entered an eruptive phase that continues to this day. The renewed activity in October 1999 produced major ashfall and led to the temporary evacuation of more than 25,000 inhabitants from Baños and the surrounding area  Activity continued at a medium level until May 2006, when activity increased dramatically, culminating in violent eruptions on 14 July 2006 and 16 August 2006. The 16 August 2006 eruption has been the most violent since activity commenced in 1999. Several pyroclastic flows were generated that killed at least five people, and destroyed a number of hamlets and roads on the eastern and northwestern slopes of the volcano.

A further eruption and evacuation occurred on 4 December 2010. Ecuador's National Agency of Risk Control issued a "red alert", later downgraded to orange. The Ecuadorean Institute for Geophysics reported a rapid increase in seismic activity, a number of explosions and an ash cloud reaching  in height.  Another eruption occurred on 18 December 2012 forcing evacuation of those living on the volcano's slopes. The volcano erupted again in July 2013, and again on 1 February 2014.

First ascent 
In June 1802, the Prussian-born explorer Alexander von Humboldt tried without success to reach the summit.  During their seven-year-long South America expedition (1868 to 1876), the German volcanologists Alphons Stübel and Wilhelm Reiss climbed Cotopaxi (Reiss with Angel Escobar; 28 November 1872) and Tungurahua (Stübel with Eusebio Rodríguez; 9 February 1873).

See also 

 Lists of volcanoes
 List of volcanoes in Ecuador
 List of stratovolcanoes

References

Further reading

External links 

  Instituto Geofisico del Ecuador
 Climbing information for Tungurahua on summitpost.org
 Banos Ecuador Weather | Daily Report

Stratovolcanoes of Ecuador
Geography of Tungurahua Province
Active volcanoes
Andean Volcanic Belt
Subduction volcanoes
Five-thousanders of the Andes